Skinnerapuram is a village in West Godavari district in the state of Andhra Pradesh in India.

Demographics
 India census, Skinnerapuram has a population of 2035 of which 1019 are males while 1016 are females. The average sex ratio of Skinnerapuram village is 997. The child population is 213, which makes up 10.47% of the total population of the village, with sex ratio 885. In 2011, the literacy rate of Skinnerapuram village was 78.43% when compared to 67.02% of Andhra Pradesh.

See also 
 Eluru

References 

Villages in West Godavari district